IT-79  is a football club based in Nuuk, Greenland. They play in the Coca Cola GM.
They won the 2016 Coca Cola GM league and made history in hometown Nuuk in a controversial final on 8 May, beating Nagdlunguak-48 5-1

Achievements 
Coca Cola GM Outdoor
First place: 2017
Third place: 2016
Second place: 2015
Third place: 2014
Coca Cola GM Futsal
First place: 2016
Second place: 2015
Third place: 2014

Football clubs in Greenland
Association football clubs established in 1979
Nuuk
1979 establishments in Greenland